Georg Julius von Schultz (October 4, 1808 – May 16, 1875; Old Style: September 22, 1808 – May 4, 1875), also known under his pseudonym Dr. Bertram, was a prominent Estophile of Baltic German heritage.  A friend of Friedrich Reinhold Kreutzwald, he was instrumental in the latter's decision to develop Kalevipoeg.

His daughter was the composer and pianist Ella Adayevskaya.

References

Sources 
 
 
 Cornelius Hasselblatt 2006: Geschichte der estnischen Literatur. Von den Anfängen bis zur Gegenwart

1808 births
1875 deaths
University of Tartu alumni
Estophiles
Baltic-German people
German medical writers